T. L. Venkatarama Iyer (25 November 1893 - 2 January 1971) was a Judge of the Supreme Court of India, a Carnatic musician and a musicologist.

Early life 
T. L. Venkatarama Iyer hails from Harikesanallur, Tirunelveli district, Tamilnadu. He born in a family with a tradition in music and research. His father, M. Lakshmanasuri was a Sanskrit scholar and was instrumental in bringing up his son to the level he achieved later in life.
Venkatarama Iyer was a close relative of Harikesanallur Muthiah Bhagavatar (a recipient of Sangeet Kalanidhi award in 1930), and was a disciple of Ambi Dikshitar (a grand-nephew of Muthuswami Dikshitar).

Law 
T. L. Venkatarama Iyer graduated from Madras Christian law College in 1916. After doing apprenticeship under Sir Alladi Krishnaswamy Iyer, he started practicing in the Madras High Court from 1917. He became a Judge of the Madras High Court in 1951 and continued to serve till November 1953. Thereafter he served as a Judge of the Supreme Court of India from 1954 up to 1958. During his tenure as Supreme Court Judge, he was also part of the constitutional bench. 
In 1958, T. L. Venkatarama Iyer held the office of the Chairman of the Second Law Commission of India till 1961.

Carnatic music 
He was an authority on Muthuswami Dikshitar's compositions. He had trained musicians like Vidya Shankar, D. K. Pattammal, Kalpagam Swaminathan, S. Srinivasa Rao and Kannamma Sharma.
In April, 1928, an Experts Committee consisting of some of the leading musicians and scholars was appointed by the Madras Music Academy. The committee was to advise the Music Academy on all technical matters including music education on correct and modern lines. T. L. Venkatarama Iyer was one of its members.
He succeeded K V Krishnaswami Iyer, upon the latter's death in 1965, and served as the 3rd president of the Madras Music Academy until his death in 1971.

Disciples 
He taught several disciples, prominent among them being Sangeeta Kalanidhis D.K.Pattammal and B Rajam Iyer. His disciples include Sandhyavandanam Srinivasa Rao, Vidya Shankar and B Krishnamurthy.

Publication 
He published the life of Muthuswami Dikshitar as a book entitled The Life of Muthuswami Dikshitar.

Awards 
Sangita Kalanidhi conferred by the Madras Music Academy in 1944
Sangeet Natak Akademi Fellowship - 1964

References

Bibliography 
TLV Foundation

External links 
Book Review

Justices of the Supreme Court of India
Carnatic singers
Recipients of the Sangeet Natak Akademi Fellowship